Sobornost is a theological journal published by the Fellowship of St Alban and St Sergius. It publishes articles on "the life and thought of the Eastern Churches and their relationship with Western Christendom." In 1979, Sobornost incorporated the Eastern Churches Review.

See also 
Sobor
Sobornost

References

External links 
 

Christianity studies journals
Publications established in 1935